Angophora leiocarpa, commonly known as rusty gum, is a species of small to medium-sized tree that is endemic to eastern Australia. It has smooth bark on the trunk and branches, lance-shaped adult leaves, flower buds usually in groups of three, white or creamy white flowers and smooth barrel-shaped to cup-shaped fruit.

Description
It has smooth pink to orange or greyish bark that is shed in small patches.

Taxonomy and naming
Rusty gum was first formally described in 1986 by Gregory John Leach from an unpublished description by Lawrie Johnson and given the name Angophora costata subsp. leiocarpa from specimens collected near Warialda High School in 1976. In 1988 Kevin Thiele and Pauline Ladiges raised it to species status as Angophora leiocarpa. The specific epithet (leiocarpa) is derived from the ancient Greek leios meaning "smooth" and karpon meaning "fruit", distinguishing this Angophora from others in the genus. A 2021 molecular analysis of the genus confirmed it was genetic divergent from the two A. costata subspecies, and in fact showed some hybridization with Angophora floribunda.

Distribution and habitat
Angophora leiocarpa grows in open forest on sandstone hills and outcrops from Blackall and Mackay in Queensland, south to Narrabri and Grafton in New South Wales.

References

leiocarpa
Flora of New South Wales
Flora of Queensland
Trees of Australia
Ornamental trees
Taxa named by Kevin Thiele
Plants described in 1986